Aeroflot Flight 593 was a passenger flight from Sheremetyevo International Airport, Moscow, Russia, to Kai Tak Airport in Hong Kong. On 23 March 1994, the aircraft operating the route, an Airbus A310-304 flown by Aeroflot, crashed into the Kuznetsk Alatau mountain range in Kemerovo Oblast, killing all 63 passengers and 12 crew members on board.

No evidence of a technical malfunction was found. Cockpit voice and flight data recorders revealed the presence of the relief captain's 13-year-old daughter and 15-year-old son in the cockpit.
While seated at the controls, the pilot's son had unknowingly partially disengaged the A310's autopilot control of the aircraft's ailerons. The autopilot then disengaged completely, causing the aircraft to roll into a steep bank and a near-vertical dive. Despite managing to level the aircraft, the first officer over-corrected when pulling up, causing the plane to stall and enter into a spin; the pilots managed to level the aircraft off once more, but the plane had descended beyond a safe altitude to initiate a recovery and subsequently crashed into the mountain range. All 75 occupants died on impact.

Background

Aircraft
The aircraft involved in the accident was a leased Airbus A310-304, registration , serial number 596, that was delivered new to Aeroflot on 11 December 1992. On average, the crew of three operating the aircraft had logged 900 hours on the type.

Passengers and crew
Of the 63 passengers on board, 40 were Russian nationals, including about 30 airline employees and family members. The remaining 23 foreigners were mostly businessmen from Hong Kong and Taiwan, who were looking for economic opportunities in Russia.

The captain of Flight 593 was Andrey Viktorovich Danilov, 40, who was hired by Aeroflot in November 1992. He had accrued over 9,500 hours of flight time, including 950 hours in the A310, of which 895 hours were as captain. The first officer was Igor Vasilyevich Piskaryov, 33, hired by Aeroflot in October 1993, who had 5,885 hours of flight time, including 440 hours in the A310. The relief captain was Yaroslav Vladimirovich Kudrinsky, 39, who was hired by Aeroflot in November 1992; he had over 8,940 flying hours, including 907 hours in the A310. Kudrinsky also had experience in the Yakovlev Yak-40, Antonov An-12, and Ilyushin Il-76. Nine flight attendants were on board the plane.

Accident
In the early hours of 23 March 1994, the aircraft was en route from Sheremetyevo International Airport in Moscow to Kai Tak Airport in Hong Kong, with 75 occupants aboard, of whom 63 were passengers. Relief pilot Kudrinsky was taking his two children on their first international flight, and they were brought to the cockpit while he was on duty. Five people were thus on the flight deck: Kudrinsky, co-pilot Piskaryov, Kudrinsky's son Eldar (age 15) and daughter Yana (age 13), and another pilot, Vladimir Makarov, who was flying as a passenger.

With the autopilot active, Kudrinsky, against regulations, let the children sit at the controls. First, Yana took the pilot's left front seat. Kudrinsky adjusted the autopilot heading to give her the impression that she was turning the plane, though she actually had no control of the aircraft. Shortly thereafter, Eldar occupied the pilot's seat. Unlike his sister, Eldar applied enough force to the control column to contradict the autopilot for 30 seconds. This caused the flight computer to switch the plane's ailerons to manual control, while maintaining control over the other flight systems. Eldar was now in partial control of the aircraft. A silent indicator light came on to alert the pilots to this partial disengagement. The pilots, who had previously flown Soviet-designed planes that had audible warning signals, apparently failed to notice it.

Eldar was the first to notice a problem, when he observed that the plane was banking right. Shortly after, the flight path indicator changed to show the new flight path of the aircraft as it turned. Since the turn was continuous, the resulting predicted flight path drawn on screen was a 180° turn. This indication is similar to those shown when in a holding pattern, where a 180° turn is required to remain in a stable position. This confused the pilots for nine seconds, during which time the plane banked past a 45° angle to almost 90°, steeper than the design allowed. The A310 cannot turn this steeply while maintaining altitude, and the plane started to descend quickly. The increased g-forces on the pilots and crew made regaining control extremely difficult for them. The autopilot, which no longer controlled the ailerons, used its other controls to compensate, pitching the nose up and increasing thrust. As a result, the plane began to stall; the autopilot, unable to cope, disengaged completely. A second, larger indicator light came on to alert the pilots of the complete disengagement, and this time they did notice it. At the same time, the autopilot's display screen went blank. To recover from the stall, an automatic system lowered the nose and put the plane into a nosedive. The reduced g-forces enabled Kudrinsky to retake his seat. Piskaryov then managed to pull out of the dive, but over-corrected, putting the plane in an almost vertical ascent, again stalling the plane, causing the plane to enter a spin. Although Kudrinsky and Piskaryov regained control and leveled out the wings, they did not know how far they had descended during the crisis and their altitude by then was too low to recover. All 75 occupants died on impact.

The aircraft crashed with its landing gear up, and all passengers had been prepared for an emergency, as they were strapped into their seats. No distress calls were made before the crash. Despite the struggles of both pilots to save the aircraft, it was later concluded that if they had just let go of the control column, the autopilot would have automatically taken action to prevent stalling, thus avoiding the accident. There was no evidence of a technical failure in the plane.

Families of Russian victims placed flowers on the crash site, while families of Chinese and Taiwanese victims scattered pieces of paper with messages written on them around the area.

Aftermath 
Aeroflot originally denied that children were in the cockpit, but accepted the fact when the Moscow-based magazine Obozrevatel published the transcript on the week of 28 September 1994. The Associated Press said, according to the transcript, "the Russian crew almost succeeded in saving the plane". The New York Times said, "A transcript of the tape printed in the magazine Obozrevatel shows that the Russian crew nearly managed to save the Airbus plane and the 75 people on board, but that it was hampered by the presence of children and its unfamiliarity with the foreign-made plane." The Times also stated that an analysis by an aviation expert published in Rossiiskiye Vesti (Russian: Российские вести) supported that analysis.

The events of Flight 593 were featured in "Kid in the Cockpit", a season-three (2005) episode of the Canadian TV series Mayday (called Air Emergency and Air Disasters in the U.S. and Air Crash Investigation in the UK and elsewhere around the world). The flight was also included in a Mayday season six (2007) Science of Disaster special titled "Who's Flying the Plane?" Michael Crichton's novel Airframe, published in 1996, draws on events from the accidents of Aeroflot 593 and China Eastern Airlines Flight 583.

See also
Aeroflot accidents and incidents
Aeroflot accidents and incidents in the 1990s
 Northwest Airlines Flight 188, where the pilots stopped monitoring the flight
 Pinnacle Airlines Flight 3701, a crash where the pilots chose, for fun, to exceed aircraft limits
 Aeroflot Flight 6502, a crash in which the pilots bet they could land blind
 United Airlines Flight 2885, a crash where the pilots let the engineer fly the plane

Further reading

References

External links

  Official accident report (English translation)
 
 Cockpit Voice Recorder transcript   
 
 

Aviation accidents and incidents in 1994
Airliner accidents and incidents caused by pilot error
Aviation accidents and incidents in Russia
593
Accidents and incidents involving the Airbus A310
1994 disasters in Russia
March 1994 events in Asia
Airliner accidents and incidents caused by stalls